Metal Allegiance is an American heavy metal supergroup formed on Long Island, New York, in 2014 by bassist and songwriter Mark Menghi. Shortly after, he recruited bassist David Ellefson (formerly of Megadeth), guitarist Alex Skolnick (from Testament), and drummer Mike Portnoy (formerly of Dream Theater). Though the group does not have an official lead singer, they usually hire guest musicians to contribute vocals and/or guitar parts to their studio recordings and live shows, including Andreas Kisser of Sepultura and Mark Osegueda of Death Angel. To date, Metal Allegiance has released two studio albums and one EP.

Background 
Metal Allegiance was formed by bassist/songwriter/producer Mark Menghi in Long Island in July 2014. Mark shortly after recruited, then-Megadeth bassist David Ellefson and drummer Mike Portnoy (The Winery Dogs, Sons of Apollo, Flying Colors and formerly Dream Theater) to perform on Motörhead's Motörboat Cruise for their first ever live appearance as Metal Allegiance, which was described as "a celebration of heavy metal, powered by the almost tribal bond shared between the extreme music community's most revered trailblazers, armed with a list of contributors onstage (and off) that read like a Wikipedia entry on the genre itself." All of the band members were longtime friends and had jammed together occasionally, including events such as the Shiprocked Cruise and NAMM; this eventually led to recording an album. It was on the Motörboat Cruise where they enlisted guitarist Alex Skolnick (Testament) as the final piece to the "Core 4." The result, the eponymous Metal Allegiance, was released on September 17, 2015, and included a number of guests, including vocals by Phil Anselmo, Randy Blythe, Troy Sanders, Chuck Billy, Mark Osegueda, Cristina Scabbia, Matt Heafy, Doug Pinnick, Jamey Jasta, Chris Jericho, Tim "Ripper" Owens, Alissa White-Gluz and Steve "Zetro" Souza, guitar by Heafy, Gary Holt, Phil Demmel, Andreas Kisser, Misha "Bulb" Mansoor, Ben Weinman, Charlie Benante and Ron "Bumblefoot" Thal, and bass by Rex Brown. It was between a span of 9 months (December 2014 to September 2015) where Menghi, Ellefson, Skolnick and Portnoy wrote, recorded, mixed and mastered their debut album while having over two dozen special guests appear on it plus signing a global record deal with Nuclear Blast Entertainment under the careful eye of AR legend Monte Conner. Metal Allegiance received positive reviews worldwide, and performed well on the charts, entering number 143 on the Billboard 200, and number 27 on the Top Rock Albums chart. The band promoted the album by touring at various venues within the United States along with performing at many festivals and one-off appearances like Loud Park Festival in Japan and Bloodstock Festival in the United Kingdom amongst others.

Metal Allegiance's next release was a digital only covers EP entitled Fallen Heroes, released on August 12, 2016, as a tribute to then-recently deceased singers Lemmy, David Bowie and Glenn Frey. The EP includes covers of Motörhead's "Iron Fist", Bowie's "Suffragette City" and the Eagles' "Life in the Fast Lane", with vocals provided by Troy Sanders, Mark Osegueda and Alissa White-Gluz respectively. In honor of all of music's Fallen Heroes, Metal Allegiance performed a special "Fallen Heroes" tribute concert at The Grove in Anaheim, California on January 20, 2017, where they exclusively covered music from all of their personal musical heroes whom have passed on.

Metal Allegiance released their second album, Volume II: Power Drunk Majesty, on September 7, 2018. In addition to Osegueda and Sanders, guest vocals on this album include Trevor Strnad, John Bush, Bobby "Blitz" Ellsworth, Mark Tornillo, Johan Hegg, Max Cavalera and Floor Jansen.

Metal Allegiance is working on new material for their third album, which will reportedly include guest appearances by Bobby "Blitz" Ellsworth and Phil Demmel.

Members 

Current line-up
 Mark Menghi – bass, songwriter (2014–present)
 Alex Skolnick – guitars (2014–present)
 David Ellefson – bass (2014–present)
 Mike Portnoy – drums (2014–present)

Live musicians
 Andreas Kisser – guitars (2014–present)
 Mark Osegueda – vocals (2015–present)
 Charlie Benante – drums (2015–2016)
 Dave Lombardo – drums (2016, 2020)
 Phil Demmel – rhythm guitar (2016)
 Chuck Billy – vocals (2022–present)
 John Bush – vocals (2022–present)

Discography

Studio albums 
 Metal Allegiance (2015)
 Volume II: Power Drunk Majesty (2018)

EPs 
 Fallen Heroes (2016)

References

External links 
 
 

Musical quartets
Hard rock musical groups from New York (state)
American supergroups
Musical groups established in 2014
2014 establishments in New York (state)
Musical groups from New York City
Thrash metal musical groups
Groove metal musical groups
Heavy metal supergroups